Azad Pattan, previously Lachman Pattan, is a village near Palandri in the Sudhanoti District of Azad Kashmir, Pakistan. It is located on border of Punjab and Azad Kashmir on bank of Guoien stream. 

The Azad Pattan bridge on the Jhelum River connects Islamabad to Rawalakot, Bagh and Pallandri.

References

Populated places in Sudhanoti District